Brachyotum alpinum is a species of plant in the family Melastomataceae. It is endemic to Ecuador.  Its natural habitats are subtropical or tropical moist montane forests and subtropical or tropical high-altitude grassland.

References

Endemic flora of Ecuador
alpinum
Least concern plants
Taxonomy articles created by Polbot
Taxa named by Alfred Cogniaux